Valentín Alsina (December 16, 1802 – September 6, 1869) was an Argentine lawyer and politician.

Biography

Early life
Alsina was born in Buenos Aires and studied law at the University of Córdoba. He occupied diverse posts in government, and had a successful civil career as an advocate and professor of law at the University of Buenos Aires.

Political views
Under the government of Juan Manuel de Rosas, he had to leave the country, as his liberal ideas did not please the dictator at all. From his refuge in Montevideo, he supported the opposition against de Rosas, both financially and through publications.

When Rosas was deposed by Justo José de Urquiza, Alsina returned to Buenos Aires, and he was elected provincial Governor in 1852. However, he resigned after a few months, shortly before a military coup took place. In 1853, Buenos Aires left the Argentine Confederation and declared itself an independent state. Alsina, a fervent supporter of Buenos Aires Province independence, became Governor again in 1857. In 1859, open hostilities broke out between Buenos Aires and the Argentine Confederation, led by Urquiza. After the defeat of the Buenos Aires army at the Battle of Cepeda on October 23, 1859, Alsina had to resign his post, and shortly after Buenos Aires rejoined the Confederation. Alsina became a member of the Argentine Senate in 1862.

When Bartolomé Mitre (President of Argentina between 1862 and 1868) offered him a position as member of the Argentine Supreme Court he refused and remained serving as a Senator until his death, which occurred just a few months after he took the oath of his son Adolfo Alsina, who became Vice President of Argentina in 1868.

References
Historical Dictionary of Argentina. London: Scarecrow Press, 1978.

See also
List of presidents of Argentina

1802 births
1869 deaths
Politicians from Buenos Aires
Argentine people of Catalan descent
National University of Córdoba alumni
19th-century Argentine lawyers
Argentine legal scholars
Governors of Buenos Aires Province
Members of the Argentine Senate for Buenos Aires Province
Burials at La Recoleta Cemetery
Unitarianists (Argentina)
Patrician families of Buenos Aires